This is a list of feature films originally released and/or distributed by Monogram Pictures and Allied Artists Pictures Corporation. Most of Monogram/Allied Artists' post-August 17, 1946 library is currently owned by Warner Bros. Entertainment, while 187 pre-August 18, 1946 Monogram films are owned by Metro-Goldwyn-Mayer and select post-1938 Monogram films are owned by Paramount Pictures.

Monogram was established in 1931, and concentrated on low-budget releases. In 1935 it was merged into the conglomerate formed by Herbert Yates as Republic Pictures, but in 1937 was re-established as an independent studio. In 1947 a separate subsidiary Allied Artists was established with the intention of releasing some higher-budget films than traditionally associated with the company. By 1953 the Monogram brand was dropped completely and Allied Artists continued until 1978, in its later years largely concentrating on the distribution of films produced by other companies, often in Europe.

Monogram Pictures

1930s
All Monogram Pictures films from the 1930s are in the public domain, except for Dark Sands and The Phantom Strikes.

1940s
All Monogram Pictures films after 1944 are copyrighted unless noted.

1950s

Allied Artists Pictures

1940s

1950s

1960s

1970s

See also
 List of Republic Pictures films
 List of Producers Releasing Corporation films
 List of Tiffany Pictures films

Notes

References
 Martin, Len D. The Allied Artists Checklist: The Feature Films and Short Subjects of Allied Artists Pictures Corporation, 1947-1978 McFarland & Company, 1993 

Monogram